Russell Fjord is a fjord in the U.S. state of Alaska. It extends north to Disenchantment Bay, the terminus of Hubbard Glacier, at the head of Yakutat Bay. The fjord was named in 1901 by Marcus Baker of the U.S. Geological Survey for explorer Israel Russell, who discovered the estuary in 1891 while exploring the Yakutat region.

The opening into Disenchantment Bay was periodically blocked by the glacier and the Russell Fjord turned into a lake collecting freshwater run-off from the glacier. The entrance closed from May to October 1986, and again briefly in 2002.

Russell Fjord Wilderness

The Russell Fjord Wilderness is a wilderness area within the Tongass National Forest, protecting  surrounding the fjord. The wilderness was established by the Alaska National Interest Lands Conservation Act in 1980  and is managed by the U.S. Forest Service. The Wrangell-Saint Elias Wilderness borders it to the northwest.

Fjords of Alaska
Bodies of water of Yakutat City and Borough, Alaska